Aniba ferruginea is a species of plant in the family Lauraceae. It is endemic to Venezuela.

References

ferruginea
Vulnerable plants
Endemic flora of Venezuela
Taxonomy articles created by Polbot